National Sewing Machine Company was a Belvidere, Illinois-based manufacturer founded in the late 19th century. The company manufactured sewing machines, washing machines, bicycles, an automobile, home workshop machinery, and cast-iron toys and novelties (under the Vindex Toy Company label).

History

Barnabas Eldredge was an  industrialist connected with the Ames Manufacturing Company of Chicopee, Massachusetts, a firearms manufacturer that also produced sewing machines with Eldredge. Ames sold off its sewing machine dies and equipment to Eldredge, who went to Chicago. There he joined forces with the existing June Manufacturing Company, founded in 1879 by F. T. June; June Manufacturing already produced the "Jennie June" model. The "Jennie June" was eventually replaced by a superior model designed by Eldredge. Eldredge took over the company in 1890 on the death of June, renaming it National Sewing Machine.

Eldredge led the company until his death in 1911. He was succeeded by David Patton.
 
Harold D. Neff headed up the Vindex toy division between 1916-1951; Vindex was the name of a product line of National's washing machines. National Sewing Machine Company and Farm Mechanics magazine partnered up, with the magazine offering Vindex toys as incentives to children to sell magazine subscriptions.

In 1953 National merged with the Free Sewing Machine Company but was unable to compete with the imported Japanese sewing machine models and the National Sewing Machine Company closed in 1957

Products

 Sewing machines
 Washing machines
 Bicycles
 Eldredge (automobile)
 Cast-iron scale models
 Cars from Oldsmobile and Pontiac
 Harley-Davidson motorcycles
 A power shovel
 Farm machinery from John Deere, Case, and Van Brunt
 Horse-drawn wagons
 Book-ends
 Table lamps
 Dog door stops
 Banks (dog and owl)
 Cigarette lighters (bulldog)
 Home workshop machinery
 Vises
 Food grinders

See also
 List of sewing machine brands

References

Belvidere, Illinois
Manufacturing companies established in 1879
Manufacturing companies disestablished in 1957
Sewing machine brands
Toy companies of the United States
1879 establishments in Illinois
1957 disestablishments in Illinois
Defunct manufacturing companies based in Illinois